Mikhail Theodoropoulos (born 1933) is a Greek wrestler. He competed in the men's Greco-Roman bantamweight at the 1960 Summer Olympics.

References

1933 births
Living people
Greek male sport wrestlers
Olympic wrestlers of Greece
Wrestlers at the 1960 Summer Olympics
People from East Attica
Sportspeople from Attica